The 2003 NCAA Division I-AA Football Championship Game was a postseason college football game between the Delaware Fightin' Blue Hens and the Colgate Raiders. The game was played on December 19, 2003, at Finley Stadium, home field of the University of Tennessee at Chattanooga. The culminating game of the 2003 NCAA Division I-AA football season, it was won by Delaware, 40–0.

Teams
The participants of the Championship Game were the finalists of the 2003 I-AA Playoffs, which began with a 16-team bracket.

Delaware Fightin' Blue Hens

Delaware finished their regular season with an 11–1 record (8–1 in conference). Their only loss was to Northeastern, while one of their wins was over Navy of Division I-A. The Fightin' Blue Hens, seeded second in the tournament, defeated Southern Illinois, Northern Iowa, and third-seed Wofford to reach the final. This was the second appearance for Delaware in a Division I-AA championship game, having lost in 1982.

Colgate Raiders

Colgate finished their regular season with a 12–0 record (7–0 in conference). The Raiders, seeded fourth in the tournament, defeated UMass, Western Illinois, and Florida Atlantic to reach the final. This was the first appearance for Colgate in a Division I-AA championship game.

Game summary

Scoring summary

Game statistics

References

Further reading

External links
 Colgate Delaware Football 2003 1st Half 1AA Championship via YouTube
 Colgate Delaware Football 2003 2nd Half 1AA Championship via YouTube

Championship Game
NCAA Division I Football Championship Games
Colgate Raiders football games
Delaware Fightin' Blue Hens football games
College football in Tennessee
American football competitions in Chattanooga, Tennessee
NCAA Division I-AA Football Championship Game
NCAA Division I-AA Football Championship Game